Suurküla is a village in Lääne-Harju Parish, Harju County, in northern Estonia.

References

 

Villages in Harju County